The Aipoceratoidea are a superfamily within the order Nautilida characterized by rapidly expanding, smooth to ribbed, cyrtoconic to coiled shells with rounded or sometimes dorsally flattened or impressed whorls, nearly straight sutures, and a ventral and marginal siphuncle. Septal necks are orthochoanitic ventrally and orthochoanitic or cyrtochoanitic dorsally.

The Aipoceratoidea are the Solenochilida according to Flower and are the Solenocheilaceae which Shimansky included in his Rutoceratina minus the Litogyroceratidae which the Treatise includes in the Rutoceratidae (Tainocerataceae)

The Aipoceratoidea include three families and at least nine genera. The families are the Aipoceratidae Hyatt 1883, Solenochilidae Hyatt 1893, and Scyphoceratidae Ruzhentsev & Shimansky 1954.

The  Aipoceratidae are represented by the loosely coiled, compressed and gyroconic Aipoceras from the Lower Carboniferous (Miss) of Europe and North America; the Solenochilidae by the tightly coiled cosmopolitan Solenochilis from the Upper Carboniferous (Penn)- Lower Permian, with  spines projecting straight out laterally from the umbilical region; Scyphoceratidae by Scyphoceras from the Lower Permian of the Urals which has a ribbed shell and a relatively small and sharply curved phragmocone. 
 
The derivation of the Aipoceratoidea is somewhat tenuous.  Kummel (1964, K385 fig. 280) shows a tentative connection to the Rutoceratidae in the Devonian. Flower also shows a tentative connection but from the equivalent Solenochilida to the Barrndeocerida. Shimansky, though, shows a direct connection from the Solenocheilaceae to the Rutoceratidae.

References

Prehistoric nautiloids
Prehistoric animal superfamilies
Mississippian first appearances
Cisuralian extinctions